The Adventurer (1752–1754) was a London 18th-century bi-weekly newspaper undertaken after the successful conclusion of The Rambler. Contributors included John Hawkesworth and Samuel Johnson.

References

Further reading
 The Adventurer. v.1 (1752); v.2 (1753); v.3 (1753)

Defunct newspapers published in the United Kingdom
Defunct weekly newspapers
Publications established in 1752
Publications disestablished in 1754
1752 establishments in England
Newspapers published in London